Yin Jiao may refer to:
 Yin Kaishan, a general and officer in Sui and Tang dynasties of China.
 Yin Jiao, a deity of Tai Sui and a character in Investiture of the Gods